Yaskino is a rural locality (a village) in Kubenskoye Rural Settlement, Kharovsky District, Vologda Oblast, Russia. The population was 10 as of 2002.

Geography 
Yaskino is located 19 km northwest of Kharovsk (the district's administrative centre) by road. Mankovo is the nearest rural locality.

References 

Rural localities in Kharovsky District